Yeborobo were a London based noise band. They were part of the Mentalist Association, a collective of bands and musicians from Maidstone, Kent. The name was taken from a South African contestant on the UK television programme Robot Wars.

Style and history
Yeborobo's image was strongly characterised by an energetic and confrontational live show, featuring substantial audience participation and unusual costumes, influenced by The Stooges and referring aesthetically to prog and metal stage shows. Musically, Yeborobo's music relied on a steady beat created by drums and twin guitars, juxtaposed with the more chaotic stylee of the two exhibitionist frontmen, with bassist Sophie Simpson forming a bridge between these two elements.

In 2006 Yeborobo's 7" 'I'm Magick Gimme A Fiver' was chosen as Single Of The Year by The Daddy Said So Land radio broadcast on Resonance fm.

The high watermark of the band's career was a support slot on a 2007 tour with Klaxons, who won the Mercury Music Prize that year. However, the move to much larger and wider audiences was often poorly received, with one reviewer remarking, "What an abortion of a support band Yeborobo turned out to be. Placing animal masks, face paint and giant cardboard arms above having two good songs to rub together. When they weren’t poking the audience with aforementioned cardboard limb, they were being sick on them. I think we can leave it there."

Yeborobo also participated in a project put together by the fashion magazine Dazed and Confused based around the Maidstone-based Mentalist Association, of which they were a part.

Post-Yeborobo 
All six members remain musically active in some way and are now dispersed across England and Scotland.

Three of the members (Andrew, Matthew and Rob) now play in the band Dog Chocolate, along with former Limn member Jono Allen. They have been described by Louder Than War as "fun, ramshackle and exciting". Dog Chocolate released their first record, a split EP with fellow London band Ravioli Me Away entitled Ravioli Me Away/Or on the Upset The Rhythm label on 24 February 2014. Dog Chocolate's side was entitled Or. On 18 March 2016 Upset The Rhythm released Dog Chocolate's debut album Snack Fans.

Other projects since Yeborobo disbanded have come from percussive duo Rob and Sam's band Gasp! Cracking Eggs who released an album entitled Club Heads, as well as a solo album by Rob as Robert Bidder, entitled Auberginion, released by Carpi Records.

Discography

Albums
Buck Up Your Ideas Scout 2004, Mentalist Association
What A Fantastic Barrier Unreleased, Mentalist Association (full album listenable on Myspace)

Singles
"I'm Magick Gimme A Fiver" 7" 2006, Slightly Off Kilter

References

English alternative rock groups
English rock music groups